Laati is a 1992 Indian Telugu-language action romance film directed by Gunasekhar, starring Prashanth, Samyuktha Singh, and Raghuvaran. The film won three Nandi Awards. The film was later dubbed into Tamil and released as Dawood Ibrahim.

Plot 
Srinivas is a young boy played by Prashanth who dreams of becoming a cop. He eventually joins a police training college and gets posted as a Police Constable in an area where don Avinash (Raghuvaran) rules over the area. Srinivas wins over Avinash, encountering ordeals. He falls in love with Sangeetha (played by debutant Samyuktha).

Cast

Soundtrack 

The soundtrack was released by Sterling Music Cassettes.

Awards
Nandi Awards
 Best Editor - Shankar
 Best First Film Director - Gunasekhar
 Best Cinematographer - K. C. Divakar

References

External links

1992 films
1990s Telugu-language films
Indian romantic action films
Films directed by Gunasekhar
Films scored by M. M. Keeravani
1992 directorial debut films